Derek Sloan  (born November 11, 1984) is a Canadian politician who formerly represented the riding of Hastings—Lennox and Addington. Shortly after being elected to the House of Commons of Canada in the 2019 Canadian federal election, Sloan ran as a candidate for the Conservative Party leadership in 2020 and was eliminated after the first ballot. He has received national news coverage for his controversial views on LGBTQ issues, and making allegedly racist remarks.

On January 20, 2021, Sloan was expelled from the Conservative Party caucus after it was revealed that he had received a donation from white supremacist Paul Fromm. Party leader Erin O'Toole explained that the decision had been made "because of a pattern of destructive behaviour involving multiple incidents."

In the 2021 Canadian federal election, Sloan ran in the Banff—Airdrie riding as an independent, and finished fifth.

Background
Sloan was born in 1984 and raised near Waterford, Ontario. He attended Kingsway College, a private Seventh-day Adventist Church-affiliated high school in Oshawa.

In 2003, Sloan enrolled at Pacific Union College (PUC), a private university in Napa Valley, California associated with the Seventh-day Adventist Church. There he completed a bachelor's degree in business in 2007. While attending PUC, Sloan served as president of the university's student association in 2007.

After graduating, Sloan moved to Toronto, Ontario to work at a water-fuel systems company. Subsequently, he ran Sloan's Furniture Liquidation in Oshawa from 2011 to 2014. In 2014, Sloan began a law degree at Queen's University in Kingston, Ontario; he finished articling in 2018. Sloan has said he pursued law because he was interested in "defending religious liberties against political correctness."

Sloan and his wife Jennifer have two daughters and a son.

Political career

2019 federal election
In 2018, Sloan announced that he would seek the Conservative Party of Canada's nomination for the riding of Hastings—Lennox and Addington. At the nomination meeting, Sloan defeated three other candidates: a city councillor who had served for fifteen years in Belleville, a lawyer who had lived in the area for twenty years, and a local business owner. Sloan defeated one-term Liberal incumbent Mike Bossio in the 2019 federal election, becoming the first Seventh-day Adventist ever elected to the Canadian House of Commons.

2020 Conservative Party leadership election
Sloan announced his candidacy for the 2020 Conservative Party of Canada leadership election on January 22, 2020. On January 27, Sloan made national headlines after tweeting in response to fellow leadership candidate Richard Décarie his belief that being gay is a choice. During an interview on the CTV Power Panel Sloan went on to elaborate that he felt that the science of whether sexual orientation is a choice is unclear. Sloan's comments were criticized by his former election campaign manager, Eric Lorenzen.

A self-identified social conservative, Sloan attracted controversy for the policy positions he endorsed throughout the leadership race. Sloan stated that were he elected leader he would permit Conservative MPs to reopen the debate on abortion or introduce private members’ bills aimed at overturning same-sex marriage. He also voiced opposition to Bill C-16, which protects people from discrimination on the basis of gender identity. He also vowed to vote against a federal ban on the pseudoscientific practice of conversion therapy, arguing that parents should be able to make children identify with the body they are born with. Sloan has been widely criticized in the media and even within the Conservative Party for these views.

On February 6, 2020, members of the Mohawks of the Bay of Quinte blockaded the Canadian National Railway north of Tyendinaga, in support the Wetʼsuwetʼen hereditary chiefs' opposition to the Coastal GasLink Pipeline within Sloan's riding of Hastings—Lennox and Addington. Sloan spoke publicly about the blockade for the first time on February 18, stating the Liberal government should have responded faster to the protests. Three days later, Sloan characterized the protesters as "radical extremists" and called on the Ontario Provincial Police to enforce an injunction to remove the blockade.

On April 21, 2020, Sloan tweeted a video in which he asked whether Canada's Chief Medical Officer Theresa Tam worked "for Canada or for China?" Sloan's comments singled out Theresa Tam, a Chinese Canadian, and were denounced as racist on social media; Prime Minister Justin Trudeau called them intolerant, saying they had no place in Canada, and several fellow Conservative MPs denounced them as personal attacks. Conservative Party leader Andrew Scheer initially declined to comment on Sloan's remarks, but stated that it was "inappropriate to question someone’s loyalty to their country" the following week. The municipality of Hastings County condemned Sloan's remarks as "cruel and racist" and unrepresentative of the people of his riding, before calling on him to be expelled from the Conservative Party. Sloan said the following day that he would not apologize, because "the idea people would think it was racist was not even on my mind. I would have said those statements about any public health officer that made those decisions in her spot." The Chinese Canadian National Council (SJ) submitted a letter to the Conservative Party demanding that Sloan be expelled from the party's caucus and denied the opportunity to run for its leadership. In an emergency session on April 29, 2020, Conservative MPs demanded Sloan apologize for his statements. In a statement on April 29, Sloan said his comments were "rhetorical" but declined to retract them.

In the leadership election, Sloan placed last on the first ballot and was subsequently eliminated after winning 14.39% of first-ballot points.

Post-leadership election
Shortly after Erin O'Toole won the leadership, Liberal MP Pam Damoff called for Sloan's expulsion from the Conservative caucus. Sloan called it part of the Liberals' electoral strategy, while O'Toole declined to say whether or not he would expel him from caucus. Despite a petition launched by anti-abortion organization Campaign Life Coalition for his inclusion, O'Toole did not include Sloan in his Shadow Cabinet.

During a campaign webinar on June 4, 2020, Sloan accused Justin Trudeau of "effectively putting into law child abuse" by proposing a ban on conversion therapy. Bay of Quinte PRIDE denounced Sloan's comments as "vile" and stated that Sloan was failing to adequately represent his LGBTQ constituents. Fellow leadership candidate Peter MacKay likewise denounced Sloan's remarks as reprehensible.

In October 2020, Sloan voted against a bill banning various forms of conversion therapy. He claimed that the bill would outlaw prayer and "amounts to child abuse", using it for fundraising purposes following the vote. Sloan signed an E-petition that raised questions about the safety of a future coronavirus vaccine. When asked about the e-petition, he stated that it had "good points".

Expulsion from Conservative caucus
On January 18, 2021, O'Toole announced plans to remove Sloan from the Conservative Party caucus (of Conservative Members of Parliament) after it was revealed that Sloan unknowingly accepted a donation of $131 from white nationalist Paul Fromm. Sloan received the money (donated under the name "Frederick P. Fromm") during the 2020 leadership campaign. Upon learning of the donation, Sloan asked the Conservative Party to arrange for its return to Fromm. He also pointed out on social media that the Conservative party had taken a ten percent cut of the donation. O'Toole also stated that Sloan would not be allowed to run as a Conservative candidate in the next federal election. The party also investigated his use of robocalls during his leadership campaign. Sloan was voted out of the Conservative caucus on January 20, 2021. The vote occurred pursuant to provisions of the Reform Act.

Before that decision was made, the Party had issued a statement that "Sloan's campaign ... sold the party membership to Fromm". In a statement on January 20, 2021, Erin O'Toole explained that Sloan's acceptance of a donation from a white nationalist was just one factor of many that led to the ouster:"The Conservative caucus voted to remove Derek Sloan not because of one specific event, but because of a pattern of destructive behaviour involving multiple incidents and disrespect towards the Conservative team for over a year."

Post-expulsion
Following his expulsion from the Conservative Party, Sloan has travelled across Ontario to speak at protests and demonstrations against public health measures enacted in response to the COVID-19 pandemic. On April 24, 2021, Sloan spoke at an anti-lockdown protest in Barrie where he recommended that the government explore treating COVID-19 using Vitamin D. The following day Sloan, Ontario MPP Randy Hillier, and other demonstrators attended a service at the Church of God in Aylmer in defiance of the Reopening Ontario Act, which limits in-person religious gatherings to ten people. Sloan has also attended demonstrations in Ottawa, Peterborough, Stratford, and Chatham. Sloan was charged in relation to the event in Aylmer and has been investigated by Belleville police regarding a gathering at Zwicks Park.

In July 2021, Sloan announced his plan to form a new political party. In August 2021, soon after the 44th federal election was called, he announced that he would contest the Alberta riding of Banff—Airdrie as an independent, and finished fifth. He came fifth while the Conservative incumbent, Blake Richards, was re-elected.

Ontario provincial politics

In December 2021, Sloan was announced as the new Leader of the Ontario Party, intending to contest the 2022 Ontario general election.

Electoral record

References

External links

 

1984 births
Lawyers in Ontario
Living people
Canadian Seventh-day Adventists
Conservative Party of Canada MPs
Independent MPs in the Canadian House of Commons
Members of the House of Commons of Canada from Ontario
Pacific Union College alumni
Politicians affected by a party expulsion process
Politicians from Belleville, Ontario
Right-wing populism in Canada
Conversion therapy